BX-912 is a small molecule that inhibits 3-phosphoinositide dependent protein kinase-1. The phosphoinositide 3-kinase/3-phosphoinositide-dependent kinase 1 (PDK1)/AKT signaling pathway plays a role in cancer cell growth, and tumor angiogenesis, and could be a new target for anti-cancer drugs.

References 

EC 2.7.11
Imidazoles
Bromoarenes
Aminopyrimidines
Ureas
Kinase inhibitors